Hemimyzon confluens is a species of ray-finned fish in the genus Hemimyzon. It is known from a single location in the Nam Ngum drainage in Laos, a tributary of the Mekong. H. confluens is threatened by pollution from mining activities and hydro-power development.

References 

 

Hemimyzon
Fish of the Mekong Basin
Fish of Laos
Endemic fauna of Laos
Fish described in 2000